is a railway station on the Nemuro Main Line of JR Hokkaido located in Nemuro, Hokkaido, Japan. The station opened on September 1, 1961.

Higashi-Nemuro is the easternmost railway station in Japan.

Gallery

References

Railway stations in Hokkaido Prefecture
Railway stations in Japan opened in 1961
Nemuro, Hokkaido